The Philippines has not officially adopted any time and date representation standard based on the ISO 8601. Notation practices across the country are in various, customary formats.

Date
In casual settings, as a legacy of American rule in the early 20th century, alphanumeric date formats are usually written with a middle-endian order (month-day-year) in a way similar to that of the United States.  Another format, the little-endian order (day-month-year),
similar way to the United Kingdom,  is applied primarily by the military and the police, although it is also used for more formal civil uses such as government memorandums, a number of tertiary-level educational institutions such as the University of the Philippines system, and business databases for companies that deal with non-East Asian clients. Other minor applications of the little-endian format include certificates, plaques, trophies and expiration dates.

There is no law mandating the date order, minimum or maximum length, or format (i.e. alphanumeric or numeric), and notations sometimes vary from office to office, in private and public sectors. For example, passports issued by the Department of Foreign Affairs, which particularly notates the date numerically as MM-DD-YY, legislative bills and executive orders are dated alphanumerically with a MMMM-DD-YYYY format. The little-endian (day-month-year) date format is always written alphanumerically by default to avoid confusion.

Hyphens (‐) and forwardslashes (/) are the most common separators for a numeric date format. The use of periods (.) are almost exclusively used for expiration dates that are normally written in the alphanumeric day-month-year format. On the other hand, an alphanumeric date in month-day-year format instead uses spacing and a comma between the day and year. The day-month-year variant likewise does not necessarily require a comma between the month and year.

Below are date format variations typically used in the Philippines:

The following date format variations are less commonly used:

In Tagalog and Filipino, however, the day-month-year notation is the format as adapted from the Spanish. The month-day-year format is also used, albeit rarely and more for Spanish recitation. The English-based formats ( or especially in the military) are used but are still read in the Tagalog day-month-year notation.

Time
The Philippines uses the 12-hour clock format in most oral or written communication, whether formal or informal. A colon is used to separate the hour from the minutes (12:30 p.m.). The use of the 24-hour clock is usually restricted in use among airports, the military, police and other technical purposes.

Spoken conventions

Numerical elements of dates and the time may pronounced using either their Spanish names or vernacular ones; the former is somewhat pedestrian whilst the latter tends to be longer, formal and academic.

Examples:

Date: 1/4/2022
English:  or 
Tagalog:  or 

Time: 8:30 p.m.
Spanish-derived:  (note  as vernacular designation for in the evening) 
English:  or 

See also
Date and time representation by country
Internationalization and localization
Philippine Standard Time

References

Philippines
Time in the Philippines